Lionel Richie/Commodores Gold is a two disc compilation album by American R&B singer Lionel Richie and American Funk and soul band Commodores, released on January 10, 2006. It contains songs from both his successful solo career and as part of the band the Commodores.

Track listing
All songs written by Lionel Richie, except where noted.

Disc one

Disc two

Charts

References 

Lionel Richie
Lionel Richie albums
Commodores albums
2006 compilation albums
Hip-O Records compilation albums
Universal Music Group compilation albums
Motown compilation albums
Split albums
Albums produced by David Foster
Albums produced by James Anthony Carmichael
Albums produced by Lionel Richie
Albums produced by Jimmy Jam and Terry Lewis